Marta Ángela Mata Garriga (22 June 1926 – 27 June 2006) was a Spanish politician and pedagogue who promoted the renovation of public schools during Spain's transition to democracy in 1978, and defended secular schools.

Biography
Her father was Josep Mata Virgili (1886–1934), an industrial technician, who died in a work accident in Madrid when Marta was 8 years old.

She went to kindergarten and elementary schools of the Barcelona City School Board, where her mother worked. In 1939 her teachers and professors were dismissed or dispersed because of the Civil War. She finished high school in 1943 at the Verdaguer Institute, and began her studies in Natural Sciences at the University of Barcelona, but before finishing the first year she was forced to interrupt her studies due to tuberculosis.

In 1944 she moved to Saifores (Banyeres), to the family house Cal Mata, an inheritance from her father. There she spent a long convalescence and, once restored to health, began to work in children's education following guidance from her mother who, because of a paralysis, had also retired to the country. Mother and daughter resided at Cal Mata until 1965.

In Saifores she started her university studies again and enrolled at the University of Barcelona's Faculty of Philosophy and Letters. She obtained a licentiate in Pedagogy in 1957 and continued with doctorate courses.

Pedagogical renovation
In Saifores, Mata also began her collaboration with the first groups of teachers involved in the pedagogical renovation movement that promoted Spanish education during the Second Republic, and with the resurgence of schools that proposed a renewal of education in Catalan. She also contacted the pedagogues Alexandre Galí, Artur Martorell, and Jordi Rubió, of whom she considered herself a disciple.

In 1959 she traveled to Geneva for the first time and contacted the International Bureau of Education, where she met the pedagogue . She also began working as a pedagogical consultant for the Catalan publishers Nova Terra and La Galera, and the recently created children's magazine Cavall Fort. She worked on some publications of the National Institute of Spanish Books and publishers Teide and Vicens Vives. In the summer of 1964 she lived for a month on Israel's Dvir kibbutz, where she learned its educational system.

In 1965 she moved her residence to Barcelona. The project extended into the so-called Summer Schools, with an important footprint inside and outside of Catalonia.

From 1965 to 1975 Mata strengthened her relationship with groups of teachers working on pedagogical renovation in Spain and Portugal, and established contacts with university professors and institutions in France, England, the USSR, Chile, and Italy, while specializing in teaching in language contact situations, and in the didactics of written language and Catalan and Spanish phonology.

From the Rosa Sensat school she promoted the creation of the magazine Perspectiva Escolar in 1974, and in 1975 promoted the declaration of the 10th Summer School: Por una nueva Escuela Pública (For a New Public School).

During 1982 and 1983 she participated in the organization and realization of the 1st Congress of Pedagogical Renovation Movements, sponsored by the Ministry of Education.

In 1984 she created the Àngels Garriga de Mata Foundation, now called the Marta Mata Garriga Foundation, an entity whose objective is the development of a dynamic conception of the school and the establishment of relations between the worlds of culture, work, entertainment, and civics. The Foundation has a library specialized in education, and archives of Mata's documents.

Political career
The death of Francisco Franco opened the door to greater political involvement for Marta Mata, who joined Socialist Convergence of Catalonia (CSC) in 1976, directed by Joan Reventós, which became part of the Socialist Party of Catalonia–Congress and, two years later, the Socialists' Party of Catalonia (PSC).

In the general elections of 1977 she was elected deputy for the district of Barcelona for the socialist coalition, and was part of the Constituent Legislature. In these years she combined the work of deputy with that of the Rosa Sensat school. From this legislature, Marta highlighted the fact that "the new legislation contemplates the participation of parents, teachers, and students in the school, and new capabilities for Catalonia."

In 1979 she was reelected, and also held a seat in the 1st Legislature until 1980, when she was elected Deputy to the Parliament of Catalonia for the district of Tarragona. From 1983 to 1984 she was a Senator representing the Parliament of Catalonia, and was one of the socialist rapporteurs, together with José Eduardo González Navas, of the first Law on Linguistic Normalization of Catalan in 1983.

From 1984 to 1988 she returned to the Parliament of Catalonia for the constituency of Barcelona. From 1987 to 1995 she was Councilor for Education of the City Council of Barcelona, where she promoted the Educating Cities movement. From 1987 to 1991, she was also responsible for the Education Department of the Barcelona Provincial Council. From 1993 to 1996 she was again Senator for the district of Barcelona.

She was also a member of the Catalan School Council as a representative of the Federation of Municipalities from 1987 to 1995, and President of the Municipal School Council of Barcelona (which had been established during her tenure as Councilor for Education) by delegation of its mayor from 1990 to 1995.

She left politics in 1996 after her official retirement. She then dealt with putting her writings in order and preparing some publications. She also collaborated on various educational projects, including the coordination of the program "El Forum en la escuela" within the framework of the Barcelona 2004 Forum.

In May 2004, she returned to the State School Council as President at the request of the then Socialist Minister María Jesús San Segundo, a responsibility she held until her death on 27 June 2006.

When she died, the then President of the Generalitat of Catalonia and personal friend of Mata, Pasqual Maragall, remembered her as the person who "pushed the pedagogical tradition to its maximum splendor".

Principal works
 Letra por letra: material programado para la enseñanza de la lectura y la escritura. Barcelona, La Galera, 1976.
 Llengua standard i nivells de llenguatge. Barcelona, Laia, 1976 (with Lluís López del Castillo).
 Cuadros de fonología castellana para la enseñanza de la lectura y la escritura. Barcelona, Bibliograf, 1978 (with Josep M. Cormand).
 Pensemos en la nueva educación. Madrid, Nuestra Cultura, 1981 (with M. J. Udina).
 Fonemas, sonidos y grafías del vocabulario básico castellano. Barcelona, Rosa Sensat, 1982.
 Fonemes, sons i grafies del vocabulari bàsic català. Barcelona, Rosa Sensat, 1986.
 Civismo y urbanidad. Barcelona, Regidoria d'Edicions i Publicacions, 1993.
 La educación pública. Barcelona, Destino, 1997.

Distinctions
 Grand Cross of Alfonso X, the Wise from Juan Carlos I of Spain, 2 December 1988

 Named Illustrious Daughter of Banyeres del Penedès, Saifores municipality, 10 March 1995
 Gold Medal of Scientific Merit from the City Council of Barcelona, 2 September 1997
 Creu de Sant Jordi from the Generalitat de Catalunya, 21 October 1997
 Invested as doctor honoris causa by the Autonomous University of Barcelona, 5 May 1999
 Ramon Fuster Award from the College of Doctors and Graduates in Philosophy and Letters and Sciences of Catalonia, 18 December 2001
 Grand Cross of the Order of Charles III (posthumous) from Juan Carlos I of Spain, 30 June 2006
 Honorable Mention of the 12th Mestres Award (posthumous), September 2006
 Lola Soler Blánquez Award (posthumous) from the Lola Soler Blánquez Foundation, 10 October 2006
 The Maritime Safety and Rescue Society named the tugboat  in her honor, July 2009
  (posthumous), March 2015

References

External links
  
 Marta Mata Garriga Foundation 

1926 births
2006 deaths
20th-century Spanish educators
20th-century Spanish women writers
Barcelona municipal councillors
Women writers from Catalonia
Members of the constituent Congress of Deputies (Spain)
Members of the 1st Congress of Deputies (Spain)
Members of the 2nd Congress of Deputies (Spain)
Members of the 5th Congress of Deputies (Spain)
Members of the Parliament of Catalonia
Members of the Senate of Spain
Recipients of the Civil Order of Alfonso X, the Wise
Socialists' Party of Catalonia politicians
University of Barcelona alumni
Women members of the Congress of Deputies (Spain)
Writers from Barcelona